Tanganyicia michelae is a species of tropical freshwater snail with an operculum, an aquatic gastropod mollusk in the family Paludomidae.

Distribution 
Tanganyicia michelae is endemic to Lake Tanganyika. It is found in only in Kala Bay, Zambia.

Ecology 
The natural habitat of this snail is freshwater lakes.

It is threatened mainly by water pollution and sedimentation.

References

Endemic fauna of Zambia
Paludomidae
Gastropods described in 1999
Snails of Lake Tanganyika